Alfalfa pest, pests specifically linked to alfalfa by name, may be:

Insects
 Blue alfalfa aphid (Acyrthosiphon kondoi)
 Alfalfa bug (Piezodorus guildinii) a stink bug
 Alfalfa plant bug (Adelphocoris lineolatus)
 Alfalfa butterfly and alfalfa caterpillar (Colias eurytheme) a butterfly
 Alfalfa looper (Autographa californica) a moth
 Alfalfa moth (Cydia medicaginis) a moth
 Alfalfa leaf tier (Dichomeris acuminata) a moth that rolls alfalfa leaves
 Alfalfa webworm (Loxostege commixtalis) a moth
 Alfalfa webworm (Loxostege cereralis) a moth
 Alfalfa weevil (Hypera postica)

Other
 Alfalfa cyst nematode (Heterodera medicaginis)
 Alfalfa dodder (Cuscuta approximata) a parasitic plant
 Large-seeded alfalfa dodder (Cuscuta campestris) a parasitic plant

See also
 List of alfalfa diseases
 Alfalfa leafcutter bee (Megachile rotundata) which pollinates alfalfa

Plant pathogens and diseases
Medicago